Anthony Partipilo (born 27 October 1994) is an Italian football player. He plays for Ternana Calcio.

Club career
He made his Serie B debut for Bari on 15 December 2012 in a game against Novara.

On 13 August 2019, he signed a 4-year contract with Ternana.

References

External links
 

1994 births
Footballers from Bari
Living people
Italian footballers
S.S.C. Bari players
Carrarese Calcio players
Cosenza Calcio players
A.C. Savoia 1908 players
CFR Cluj players
Virtus Francavilla Calcio players
Ternana Calcio players
Serie B players
Serie C players
Serie D players
Italian expatriate footballers
Expatriate footballers in Romania
Association football forwards